Briden is a surname. Notable people with the surname include:

 Briden (Surrey cricketer), given name not known
 Archie Briden (1897–1974), Canadian hockey player
 James Briden, American politician
 Lara Briden (born 1969), Canadian author, doctor, and health speaker